Sheldon Gomberg is an American record producer, audio engineer and bassist, who has worked with many artists including Ben Harper, Charlie Musselwhite, Warren Zevon, Rickie Lee Jones, Ryan Adams, Kenny Wayne Shepherd, Five for Fighting, Mandy Moore, k.d. lang, Fistful of Mercy, Victoria Williams, Ron Sexsmith, Lucinda Williams, Jackson Browne, Shelby Lynne, She & Him, The Living Sisters, Joseph Arthur, Plain White T's, Mark Eitzel, Steve Forbert, Ramsay Midwood, and more.

In 2014, he received a Grammy Award for his role as engineer, mixer, and co-producer of the Ben Harper with Charlie Musselwhite album, Get Up!.

The Five For Fighting album, America Town, that he played bass on sold platinum, and the song, "Superman" was also nominated for a Grammy Award in 2002.

The album, Timeless: Hank Williams Tribute, that he played upright bass on with Ryan Adams won the 2001 Grammy for Best Country Album.

Sheldon currently lives in Los Angeles, where he produces and records various artists.

Discography

Partial list of credits:
Ben Harper (with Charlie Musselwhite), Get Up! – Engineer, Mixer, Co-Producer
Peter Case, HWY 62  – Producer, Engineer, Mixer
Watkins Family Hour – Producer, Engineer, Mixer
Eleni Mandell, Dark Lights Up – Producer, Engineer, Mixer
The Living Sisters, Harmony Is Real: Songs For A Happy Holiday  – Producer, Engineer, Mixer
Rickie Lee Jones, The Devil You Know – Engineer, Mixer, Upright Bass, Producer
Mark Eitzel, Don't Be A Stranger – Producer, Engineer, Mixer, Electric Bass, Upright Bass
Steve Forbert, Over With You – Engineer, Mixer, Electric Bass, Upright Bass
Warren Zevon, My Ride's Here – Electric Bass, Upright Bass
Ryan Adams, Demolition – Electric Bass
Ryan Adams, Timeless: Hank Williams Tribute – Upright Bass
Rickie Lee Jones, Duchess Of Coolsville An Anthology – Electric Bass
Rickie Lee Jones, Party of Five Soundtrack – Electric Bass
Rickie Lee Jones, Balm In Gilead – Engineer, Co-Producer
Rickie Lee Jones, The Village – Engineer, Mixer
Fistful Of Mercy, As I Call You Down  – Upright Bass, Engineer, Mixing
Five for Fighting, America Town – Electric Bass, Upright Bass
Five For Fighting, Grammy Nominees 2002 – Electric Bass
Mandy Moore, Coverage – Upright Bass
The Creekdippers - Mystic Theater – Upright Bass
Plain White T's, Wonders of the Younger – Engineer
Warpaint, The Fool – Mix Assistant
The Living Sisters, Love To Live – Electric Bass, Upright Bass, Producer, Engineer, Mixer
Larry Goldings, In My Room – Engineer
Grant-Lee Phillips, Virginia Creeper – Upright Bass
Michael Penn , Mr. Hollywood Jr., 1947 – Bass
Chris Spedding, Wayne Kramer Presents: Beyond Cyberpunk – Electric Bass
Peter Himmelman , Imperfect World  – Electric Bass
Peter Himmelman, Unstoppable Forces – Electric Bass, Co-Producer
Peter Himmelman, My Lemonade Stand – Electric Bass
Peter Himmelman, Mission Of My Soul; The Best Of – Electric Bass
Eleni Mandell, Thrill – Electric Bass, Upright Bass
Eleni Mandell, Snakebite – Upright Bass
Eleni Mandell, Artificial Fire – Engineer
Eleni Mandell, Miracle Of Five – Engineer
Grey DeLisle, Iron Flowers – Upright Bass
Grey DeLisle, Graceful Ghost – Electric Bass, Upright Bass
Grey DeLisle, Homewrecker – Electric Bass, Upright Bass
Shivaree, Corrupt and Immoral Transmissions – Electric Bass

References

External links
 
 ARTISTdirect credits
 Interview: Sheldon Gomberg

American record producers
American bass guitarists
Living people
Year of birth missing (living people)